Ballyvoy ( or Baile Bhuí) is a small village and townland in County Antrim, Northern Ireland. It is on the main A2 coast road 5 km east of Ballycastle and 17 km north west of Cushendall. In the 2001 Census it had a population of 72 people. It lies within the Antrim Coast and Glens Area of Outstanding Natural Beauty and is part of Causeway Coast and Glens District Council.

The village is sited between a high ridge to the north, and the valley of the Carey River to the south with its distinctive terraces and wooded banks. The village, for its size, has a good range of commercial, social, educational and community facilities. After a long period of inactivity in  housing development, a medium-sized development has been undertaken at Blackpark Road.

Ballyvoy is also a Townland in the Parish of Kilbride near Ballyclare Co. Antrim.

People 
The order of the Knights of Columbanus was founded in 1915 by James K Cannon O'Neill. He was born and raised at Carey House, Ballypatrick, Carey. He studied at the Classical School in Downpatrick, enrolled in St. Malachy's Diocesan College in February 1872 and entered Maynooth in September 1875. In 1906 he was appointed parish priest of the Sacred Heart Parish, Oldpark Rd., Belfast.

He died on 18 March 1922 and is buried in Ballyvoy.

Bob Huggins Northern Irish broadcaster and Journalist lives in the village. His second cousin, (Jeremy William Huggins (3 November 1933 – 12 September 1995), known professionally as Jeremy Brett, was an English actor. He played fictional detective Sherlock Holmes in four Granada TV series from 1984 to 1994 in all 41 episodes. His career spanned from stage, to television and film, to Shakespeare and musical theatre. He is also remembered for playing the besotted Freddie Eynsford-Hill in the Warner Bros. 1964 production of My Fair Lady. Brett visited the Huggins family home in Ballyvoy in 1952.

Education 
Barnish Primary School

References 

NI Neighbourhood Information System
Draft Northern Area Plan 2016
Knights of Columbanus
 
[Jeremy Brett] actor

External links 
North Antrim.com - Ballyvoy

See also 
List of villages in Northern Ireland

Villages in County Antrim